Conus cancellatus, common name the cancellate cone, is a species of sea snail, a marine gastropod mollusk in the family Conidae, the cone snails and their allies.

Like all species within the genus Conus, these snails are predatory and venomous. They are capable of "stinging" humans; live ones should be handled carefully or not at all.
Subspecies 
 Conus cancellatus capricorni Van Mol, Tursch & Kempf, 1967
 Conus cancellatus finkli Petuch, 1987 (synonym: Conasprelloides cancellatus finkli (Petuch, 1987) )

Distribution
This species occurs in the Caribbean Sea, the Gulf of Mexico and the Lesser Antilles.

Description 
The maximum recorded shell length is 80 mm.

The pear-shaped shell is broad and angulated at the shoulder, contracted towards the base. The body whorl is closely sulcate throughout, the sulci striate. The intervening ridges are rounded. The spire carinate and concavely elevated. Its apex is acute and striate. The color of the shell is whitish, obscurely doubly banded with clouds of light chestnut. The spire is maculated with the same.

Habitat 
Minimum recorded depth is 26 m. Maximum recorded depth is 110 m.

References

 Filmer R.M. (2001). A Catalogue of Nomenclature and Taxonomy in the Living Conidae 1758 – 1998. Backhuys Publishers, Leiden. 388pp.
 Rosenberg, G., F. Moretzsohn, and E. F. García. 2009. Gastropoda (Mollusca) of the Gulf of Mexico, pp. 579–699 in Felder, D.L. and D.K. Camp (eds.), Gulf of Mexico–Origins, Waters, and Biota. Biodiversity. Texas A&M Press, College Station, Texas
 Tucker J.K. (2009). Recent cone species database. September 4, 2009 Edition
 Tucker J.K. & Tenorio M.J. (2009) Systematic classification of Recent and fossil conoidean gastropods. Hackenheim: Conchbooks. 296 pp.
 Liu J.Y. [Ruiyu] (ed.). (2008). Checklist of marine biota of China seas. China Science Press. 1267 pp.
 Puillandre N., Duda T.F., Meyer C., Olivera B.M. & Bouchet P. (2015). One, four or 100 genera? A new classification of the cone snails. Journal of Molluscan Studies. 81: 1–23

External links
 
 Cone Shells – Knights of the Sea
 Holotype of Conus cancellatus capricorni in MNHN, Paris

Gallery

cancellatus
Gastropods described in 1792